The Financial Institutions Regulatory and Interest Rate Control Act of 1978 is a United States federal law. Among other measures, it established the Federal Financial Institutions Examination Council (FFIEC, under Title X of the act) and authorized national security letters (NSLs, under the Right to Financial Privacy Act, Title XI of the act).

References

External links
"About the FFIEC"
Public Law 95-630, 95th Congress, H.R. 14279: Financial Institutions Regulatory and Interest Rate Control Act of 1978

1978 in law